Myrsine fasciculata is a species of plant in the family Primulaceae endemic to French Polynesia.

References

Endemic flora of French Polynesia
fasciculata
Least concern plants
Taxonomy articles created by Polbot